Arvidson is a surname of Swedish origin. Notable people with the surname include:

 Linda Arvidson (1884–1949), American actress 
 Kenneth Owen Arvidson (born 1938), New Zealand poet 
 August Theodor Arvidson (1883–?), Swedish bishop

See also
Arvidsson

Surnames of Swedish origin